Saru Khan Sahandlu was a powerful and high-ranking aristocrat from the Turkoman Sahandlu tribe, who served as the head of the royal bodyguard (qurchi-bashi) from 1682 to 1691. In 1690, he had 40 members of the Zanganeh tribe killed, which made the Zanganeh nobleman Shahqoli Khan Zanganeh protest to shah Suleiman I (r. 1666–1694), stating that Saru Khan had humiliated the name of his deceased father Shaykh Ali Khan by doing so. Suleiman forgave Saru Khan, due to the good relation they had. However, this was soon to end: in 1691, Suleiman had Saru Khan beheaded due to having a love relationship with Maryam Begum, the aunt of Suleiman.

Sources 
 

Safavid military officers
Iranian Turkmen people
17th-century births
1691 deaths
Qurchi-bashi
Safavid governors of Semnan
Safavid governors of Hamadan
People executed by Safavid Iran
17th-century people of Safavid Iran